The 1932 Saint Louis Billikens football team was an American football team that represented Saint Louis University as an independent during the 1932 college football season. In its third season under head coach Chile Walsh, the team compiled a 5–2 record and outscored opponents by a total of 103 to 50. The team beat both Washington University and Missouri to win the Missouri state championship.  Home games were played at Walsh Stadium in St. Louis.

Schedule

References

Saint Louis
Saint Louis Billikens football seasons
Saint Louis Billikens football